Alv Jakob Fostervoll (20 January 1932 – 15 June 2015) was a Norwegian politician for the Labour Party. He served as Norwegian Minister of Defence and Governor of Møre og Romsdal.

Biography
Fostervoll was born at Kristiansund in Møre og Romsdal, Norway. He attended the teachers college in Volda and worked as a school teacher prior to entering politics.  He held various political position in Kristiansund municipality council from 1959 to 1969, serving as deputy mayor in the period 1967–1969. From 1967 to 1969 he was also a member of Møre og Romsdal county council.

He was elected to the Parliament of Norway from Møre og Romsdal in 1969, and was re-elected on one occasion. He was appointed Minister of Defence in 1971–1972 during the first cabinet  and in 1973–1976 during the second cabinet of Prime Minister, Trygve Bratteli. While he was appointed to the cabinet, his place in the Norwegian Parliament was taken by Oskar Edøy.

He was the president of the Norwegian Defense Association (Norges Forsvarsforening) from 1981 to 1989 and of the Norwegian Atlantic Committee from 1995 to 2007.
His career in politics ended with the post of County Governor of Møre og Romsdal, which he held from 1977 to 2002.

Honors
Commander of the Order of St. Olav, 1995
Commander of the 1st degree Order of the Dannebrog, 1993
Commander of the Order of the Crown (Belgium), 1998
King Olav Vs Jubilee Medal, 1957–1982, 1982

References

Other sources

1932 births
2015 deaths
Politicians from Kristiansund
Volda University College alumni
Government ministers of Norway
Labour Party (Norway) politicians
20th-century Norwegian politicians
Members of the Storting
County governors of Norway
Møre og Romsdal politicians
Norwegian Army personnel
Norwegian schoolteachers
Norwegian non-fiction writers
Recipients of the St. Olav's Medal
Commanders First Class of the Order of the Dannebrog
Commanders of the Order of the Crown (Belgium)
Defence ministers of Norway